Venus Optics (Anhui ChangGeng Optics Technology Co., Ltd.) is a Chinese manufacturer of photographic lenses, specialized in the design of innovative macro, wide angle, shift and f/0.95 lenses. Headquarters and production are in Hefei, while sales and marketing office is located in Hong Kong and the USA. They are currently marketing the lenses using the brand 'Laowa'.

Company 

Venus Optics was founded in 2013. Founder, managing director  and chief developer is Dayong Li  who graduated in opto-electronic engineering from the Beijing Institute of Technology.

The company develops and produces innovative
 photographic lenses under the brand name Laowa ('old frog').

Laowa's optics designer, Dayong Li, is believed to be the optics designer of Tamron, the reputable camera lens manufacturer from Japan. He was heavily involved in numerous Tamron's project development including the popular 24-70mm f/2.8 and 70-200mm f/2.8.

Lenses

The first lens was the 60 mm f/2.8 2 x Ultra Macro, a full frame lens with a magnification factor of 2:1 that could also be focused to infinity which is unique. In the same year, Venus Optics released the widest angle macro lens to offer a 1:1 magnification ratio, the 15 mm f/4 Wide Angle Macro. The small focal length allows to include the background details (e.g., where and how the subject lives) in the photo. Due to physical reasons, the working distance in the macro range is rather short (at 1:1, focusing distance is 12.2 cm resulting in a working distance of only 4.7 mm). In the meantime, Venus Optics have released unique lenses mainly in the fields of ultra macro and rectilinear and/or fast ultra wide angle lenses for full frame, APS-C, MFT, and Fujifilm G-Mount (see table).

Most Laowa lenses (an exception is e.g., the 100 mm f/2,8 2x Ultra Macro APO) are purely manual lenses. There is no communication between the camera body and the lens, hence, no transfer of Exif data, no autofocus function, no lens-based image stabilization (OIS), and no automatic aperture control. However, autofocus plays a minor role in macro and wide angle photography. Auto focus bracketing is not possible with manual lenses. The company does not exclude the development of more lenses with electronics in them.

Advertising 
Since 2017, Laowa had organised multiple international marketing campaigns bearing its slogan "New Idea, New Fun".

Competitions 
Laowa has used competition as an advertising vehicle to encourage its users to share their image. The company first started organising Laowa Photo Competition in 2017. Initially focusing on photos from its own lenses, and later it also allow images taken with other brand's lenses. As of 2021, there are other brands collaborate in the 5th Laowa Photo Competition and sponsored prize for the event.

Laowa Video Marathon 
Laowa Video Marathon is an invitation-only program launched by Laowa in 2021. It has gathered 10 videographers and YouTubers, including Motoaki(Aki from Japan), Jason Morris, Helena Gudkova(cameragirlhelena), Yeyoph and more. The program consists of 10 one-minute long short films. Each video's beginning would match the ending shot from the last video.

Laowagrapher 
In early 2021, Laowa interviewed multiple up-and-coming photographers and introduced them as "Laowagrapher". It consists group of photographers from all over the world.

See also

List of photographic equipment makers

References

External links
 Website of Venus Optics

Manufacturing companies based in Hefei
Lens manufacturers
Photography companies of China
Optics manufacturing companies
Chinese brands